Muhammad Wafiq (born 25 April 1996) is a Malaysian cricketer. He played for Malaysia in the 2017 ICC World Cricket League Division Three tournament in May 2017. In April 2018, he was named in Malaysia's squad for the 2018 ICC World Cricket League Division Four tournament, also in Malaysia. He was named as the player to watch in the squad ahead of the tournament. In October 2018, he was named in Malaysia's squad in the Eastern sub-region group for the 2018–19 ICC World Twenty20 Asia Qualifier tournament.

In September 2019, he was named in Malaysia's Twenty20 International (T20I) squad for their series against Vanuatu. He made his T20I debut for Malayasia, against Vanuatu, on 29 September 2019. In July 2022, he was named in Malaysia's squad for the 2022 Canada Cricket World Cup Challenge League A tournament. He made his List A debut on 28 July 2022, for Malaysia against Vanuatu.

References

External links
 

1996 births
Living people
Malaysian cricketers
Malaysia Twenty20 International cricketers
Place of birth missing (living people)
Cricketers at the 2014 Asian Games
Southeast Asian Games gold medalists for Malaysia
Southeast Asian Games silver medalists for Malaysia
Southeast Asian Games medalists in cricket
Competitors at the 2017 Southeast Asian Games
Asian Games competitors for Malaysia